Promil Pre-school i-Shine Talent Camp is a Philippine television reality based talent show broadcast by GMA Network. It premiered on June 12, 2011. The show concluded on August 9, 2014 with a total of 29 episodes and 4 seasons.

It features kids ages from four to seven years old. For seasons 2 to 4, the prizes were Php 500,000 and a contract with Star Magic. While Php 200,000 and a contract with GMA Artist Center in the first season.

History
I-Shine Talent Camp TV premiered on June 12, 2011 in GMA Network and ended on July 31 featured Sean Antoine Samonte as the winner. After 11 months of hiatus, it premiered its first season in ABS-CBN last June 23, 2012 and ended on July 28. The second season began on June 8, 2013 and ended on July 27. The third season was aired from June 28, 2014 to August 9, 2014.

Hosts
Dimples Romana 
Karylle 
Xian Lim 
Matteo Guidicelli 
Paolo Contis 
Mikee Cojuangco-Jaworski 
Jillian Ward

Winners
Sean Samonte 
Lucas Magallano 
Yesha Camile 
Esang de Torres 
Sean Hayden Bermudez 
Alliyah Umandal 
Seth Levi Salada

Ratings
According to AGB Nielsen Philippines' Mega Manila household television ratings, the pilot episode of i-Shine Talent Camp earned an 8.8% rating. While the final episode broadcast by GMA Network scored an 11.4% rating.

References

External links
 

2011 Philippine television series debuts
2014 Philippine television series endings
ABS-CBN original programming
Filipino-language television shows
GMA Network original programming
Philippine reality television series